Gerard Granollers and Fabrício Neis were the defending champions but chose not to defend their title.

Nuno Borges and Francisco Cabral won the title after defeating Jesper de Jong and Bart Stevens 6–3, 6–7(4–7), [10–5] in the final.

Seeds

Draw

References

External links
 Main draw

Braga Open - Doubles